Noel Carton (born 15 April 1981 in Clonroche, County Wexford) is an Irish sportsperson.  He plays hurling with his local club Cloughbawn and succeeded Damien Fitzhenry as goalkeeper on the Wexford senior inter-county team in 2010.
But left the panel in 2011.

References

1981 births
Living people
Hurling goalkeepers
Cloughbawn hurlers
Wexford inter-county hurlers